The Bloc pot ran fifty-six candidates in the 2003 Quebec provincial election, none of whom were elected. Information about these candidates may be found on this page.

Candidates

Argenteuil: Yannick Charpentier
Yannick Charpentier received 292 votes (1.23%), finishing fifth against Liberal incumbent David Whissell.

Chapleau: Daniel Leblanc-Poirier
Daniel Leblanc-Poirier was born in 1984 in Campbellton, New Brunswick and raised in suburban Ottawa. He holds a Bachelor of Arts degree in Political Science from the Université du Québec à Montréal and has published two works of poetry: La lune n'aura pas de chandelier (2007) and Gyrophares de danse parfaite (2010). He received 402 votes (1.34%) in 2003, finishing fourth against Liberal incumbent Benoît Pelletier.

Richelieu: Marie-Hélène Charbonneau
Marie-Hélène Charbonneau identified as a young comedian from Saint-Barnabé, Quebec and ran a low-profile campaign. She received 407 votes (1.42%), finishing fourth against Parti Québécois incumbent Sylvain Simard.

Viau: Guillaume Blouin-Beaudoin
Guillaume Blouin-Beaudoin was a Bloc pot candidate in the 1998 and 2003 provincial elections. He received 6.23% of the vote in his first bid for public office, a record for the party : unexpected withdrawal of the local Parti Québécois candidate halfway through the campaign helped Bloun-Beaudon to reach 3rd place. In the 2003 election, Blouin-Beaudoin was described as twenty-three years old with a CEGEP education.

He intended to run as a Projet Montréal candidate in the 2005 Montreal municipal election for a council seat in the Desmarchais-Crawford ward, but withdrew before election day.  He continued municipal politics through citizens' question periods and, amongst other propositions, demanded that public consultations be publicised in bus shelters; he also demanded that the water-meter contract be canceled.  He than ran as an independent in 2009 in François-Perrault ; in this campaign, he described himself as having a degree in environmental management and wanting to have a direct democracy approach.

References

Candidates in Quebec provincial elections
2003